Karl-Heinz Adler (20 June 1927 – 4 November 2018) was a German abstract painter, graphic artist and conceptual artist and has been described as "one of Germany’s foremost representatives of Concrete Art."  He produced many public monuments and developed, with Friedrich Kracht, modular concrete decoration for  hundreds of buildings across East, now eastern, Germany.

As a full member of the Deutscher Künstlerbund (DKB), Adler participated in the DKB annual exhibitions in 1992 and 1993. Adler died in Dresden on November 4, 2018, at the age of 91. His grave is located in Loschwitz Cemetery.

Other sources
Lybke, Gerd Harry, ed. (2017) Karl-Heinz Adler: Kunst im System – System in der Kunst, Spector Books

References

East German artists
1927 births
2018 deaths
Concrete art
20th-century German sculptors
20th-century German male artists
German male sculptors
Officers Crosses of the Order of Merit of the Federal Republic of Germany